Here We Go may refer to:

Music

Albums
Here We Go (US5 album), 2005
Here We Go! (Arashi album), 2002
Here We Go... (Chanty Savage album), 1994
Here We Go, debut album of German duo Soul Control, 2004

EPs
Here We Go (EP), a 2000 EP by 28 Days

Songs
"Here We Go" (football chant), the archetypal football chant
"Here We Go", a 1972 song by Joe Walsh and Barnstorm on their debut album Barnstorm
"Here We Go" (John Paul Young song), 1977
"Here We Go", a 1980 song by Minnie Riperton, released posthumously, from the album Love Lives Forever 
"Here We Go (Let's Rock & Roll)", a 1991 song by C+C Music Factory
"Here We Go" (Stakka Bo song), 1993
"Here We Go" (Steelers song), a 1994 fight song of the Pittsburgh Steelers
"Here We Go", a 1995 song by Shelter from the album Mantra
"Here We Go" (NSYNC song), 1997
"Here We Go" (Moonbaby song), 2000
"Here We Go" (Trina song), 2005
"Here We Go", a song by Bowling for Soup for the 2004 movie Scooby-Doo 2: Monsters Unleashed
"Here We Go" (May J. song), 2006
"Here We Go!" (Missile Innovation song), 2006
"Here We Go Yo," a 2006 song by Hector "El Father" and Jay-Z from the album Los Rompe Discotekas (2006)
"Here We Go" (Stat Quo song), 2007
"Here We Go", a 2012 song by Hard Rock Sofa and Swanky Tunes
"Here We Go" (PeR song), 2013
"Here We Go", a 2014 song by Lower Than Atlantis from the album Lower Than Atlantis

Other
 Here WeGo, a maps and navigation application
 "Here we go!", a tagline used by Italian sports journalist Fabrizio Romano
 Here We Go (TV series), a British situation comedy

See also
Here We Go Again (disambiguation)
Here I Go (disambiguation)